Mehdi Jafari (born 1969) is an Iranian film director, screenwriter and cinematographer. In 2021, he won the Crystal Simorgh for Best Director at the 39th Fajr Film Festival.

Filmography

Feature films

Home video

Cinematography

Film

Television

Awards and nominations

References

External links 

 

Iranian male writers
Iranian documentary filmmakers
Iranian film directors
Iranian cinematographers
People from Ahvaz
Living people
1969 births